World Horse Welfare is a registered charity in the United Kingdom and Scotland that was previously named The International League for the Protection of Horses. Anne, Princess Royal is its patron.

History

World Horse Welfare was founded in 1927 as a campaigning organisation to prevent the export of live British horses for slaughter. The charity's founder, Ada Cole, was spurred into action after witnessing a procession of British work horses being unloaded and whipped for four miles to slaughter in Belgium.

The Irish branch was founded in 1928 by Eleanor Whitton.

In 1937 after political lobbying by the charity, the Exportation of Horses Act was introduced to protect the welfare of horses destined for the slaughterhouses of Europe. This introduced the concept of 'Minimum Values', which effectively stops the export of live horses for slaughter from Great Britain.

The charity opened its first horse rehabilitation centre in Britain, in 1949, and started its first international training course in Morocco in 1985.

Aims
World Horse Welfare works in the United Kingdom recovering, rehabilitating and rehoming horses. The charity has 16 full-time field officers based around the UK who investigate concerns reported by the general public.

Horses needing attention are taken into one of the charity's four Recovery and Rehabilitation Centres, based in Norfolk, Somerset (the Glenda Spooner Farm), Lancashire and Aberdeenshire.

The charity works in the developing world training local people in skills such as saddlery, farriery, nutrition and horse management.

World Horse Welfare campaign to achieve welfare improvements through changing policy, practices and attitudes.

References

External links
World Horse Welfare's website

Animal charities based in the United Kingdom
Animal welfare organisations based in the United Kingdom
Horse sanctuaries
Organisations based in the United Kingdom with royal patronage
Organizations established in 1927
Charities based in Norfolk
Horse welfare organizations